Du vet väl om att du är värdefull is a Christian song written and composed by Ingemar Olsson. Gothenburg trallpunk band Sten & Stalin paraphrased the song on the 2003 album Värdelös.

Publication
Number 18 in Cantarellen 1984
Number 697 in Psalmer och Sånger 1987 under the lines "Tillsammans i världen".
Number 620 in Segertoner 1988 under the lines "Tillsammans i världen".
Number 791 in Verbums psalmbokstillägg 2003 under the lines "Tillsammans i världen".

References

External links
Song lyrics

Swedish Christian hymns
1984 songs